Colin Jack Tyre, Lord Tyre,  (born 17 April 1956) is a Scottish lawyer, former President of the Council of Bars and Law Societies of Europe, and a Senator of the College of Justice, a judge of the Supreme Courts of Scotland.

Early life
Tyre studied at the School of Law of the University of Edinburgh and took a postgraduate diploma at the University of Aix-Marseille before returning to Edinburgh as a lecturer from 1980–1983. He was admitted as an advocate in 1987 and served as Standing Junior Counsel (legal advisor) to the Procurement Executive of the Ministry of Defence from 1991 to 1995 and to the Environment Department of the Scottish Office from 1995 to 1998. He was appointed Queen's Counsel in 1998.

Legal career
From 2003 to 2009, Tyre was a part-time member of the Scottish Law Commission, and in 2007 was elected President of the Council of Bars and Law Societies of Europe. In April 2010, he was appointed a Senator of the College of Justice, a judge of the Court of Session and High Court of Justiciary, the Supreme Courts of Scotland, taking the judicial title, Lord Tyre. He was awarded a CBE in the 2010 Birthday Honours for services to the administration of justice.

On 7 December 2021, it was announced that Tyre would be appointed to the Inner House of the Court of Session with effect from 5 January 2022.

On 13 April 2021, he was appointed to Her Majesty's Privy Council.

Personal life
Tyre is a widower; his wife Elaine, who was Director of Professional Legal Studies at the University of Edinburgh School of Law, died in December 2010.

Tyre has three children, Kirsty, Catriona and Euan and lives near Dunbar in East Lothian. He enjoys hillwalking and orienteering and is a member of the Dunbar Golf Club.

References

1956 births
Living people
Members of the Faculty of Advocates
Tyre
Alumni of the University of Edinburgh
Paul Cézanne University alumni
Scottish King's Counsel
20th-century King's Counsel
Members of the Privy Council of the United Kingdom
Commanders of the Order of the British Empire
Academics of the University of Edinburgh